The Biggest Little Farm is a 2018 American documentary film, directed by John Chester. The film profiles the life of John Chester and his wife Molly as they acquire and establish themselves on Apricot Lane Farms in Moorpark, California.

The film premiered on September 1, 2018 at the Telluride Film Festival. It had its second screening at the 2018 Toronto International Film Festival, where it was named second runner-up for the People's Choice Award: Documentaries. It was selected as the Opening Night film at Doc NYC in November 2018. The film was screened as part of the Spotlight Section at the 2019 Sundance Film Festival. It also screened at the 29th New Orleans Film Festival on October 24, 2018.

The film was acquired for theatrical distribution by the independent film company Neon, and was released on May 10, 2019 in Los Angeles and New York. The film expanded into Austin, Boston, Chicago, Dallas, Denver, Houston, Minneapolis, Nashville, Philadelphia, Phoenix, Portland, San Diego, San Francisco and Washington D.C on May 17 and additional markets throughout May and June. The film was acquired by The Exchange for international distribution.

Synopsis
In 2010, married couple Molly and John Chester decide to leave their old lives in Los Angeles behind and purchase an abandoned, 234-acre farm near Moorpark in neighboring Ventura County, California. Rechristening it "Apricot Lane Farms", the couple spends the next seven years transforming the arid landscape into a fully functional farm and biodiverse habitat for neighboring flora and fauna. They face hardship as the difficulties of keeping a farm running mount up, often resulting in frustration and anger, but also happiness at their harmonious relationship with nature.

Reception
The site's critical consensus reads, "Uplifting, educational, and entertaining, The Biggest Little Farm is an environmental advocacy documentary with a satisfying side dish of hope for the future." On Metacritic, it holds a 74/100 score (indicating "generally favorable reviews") based on 25 critics.

In his Variety review of the film, Peter DeBruge noted that it "feel[s] like fresh air for the soul.", and New York Times critic Glenn Kenny wrote "it may also revive your wonder at the weird but ultimately awe-inspiring ways in which humans can help nature do its work". Additionally, The Los Angeles Times's Robert Abele wrote that the film is a "lush tour of transformed land and photogenic fauna, is so appealing as a chronicle of dedicated do-gooders who actually did good (and shot every frame of it). [...] Watching the Chesters fight past disillusionment to learn the real lessons of harvesting in communion with nature is what gives the movie its rousing, illuminating power."

On December 4, 2019, the film's composer, Jeff Beal, conducted the Hollywood Chamber Orchestra, performing his score live to picture at the Wiltern Theater in Los Angeles.

Awards and nominations 

A list of nominations and awards the film has received is as follows:
Palm Springs International Film Festival - Audience Award for Best Documentary 
Toronto International Film Festival - Second runner-up for The Grolsch People's Choice Documentary Award 
Sundance Film Festival - Runner-up for the Festival Favorite Award 
American Film Institute Fest - Audience Award for Best Feature  
Boulder Film Festival - Grand Jury Prize for Feature Length Film  
Boulder Film Festival - Best Documentary  
Mill Valley Film Festival - Silver Audience Award for Valley of the Docs Presentation  
Hamptons International Film Festival - Audience Award for Best Documentary Feature 
Middleburg Film Festival - Audience Award for Best Documentary 
Annapolis Film Festival - Audience Award for Best Feature Documentary 
Gasparilla Film Festival - Grand Jury Prize for Best Feature Documentary
Sedona Film Festival - Best of the Fest 
Sedona Film Festival - Director's Choice Award for Best Documentary 
92nd Oscars Shortlist - Documentary Feature

Distribution  
The film is distributed by Energia in Latin America. It is currently available for streaming in Netflix Latin America as "Mi gran pequeña granja".

References

External links

Official trailer
Apricot Lane Farms website

2018 films
2018 documentary films
American documentary films
Documentary films about agriculture in the United States
Films set in Ventura County, California
Films shot in Ventura County, California
Films scored by Jeff Beal
LD Entertainment films
Neon (distributor) films
Agriculture in California
2010s English-language films
2010s American films